Savola may refer to:

 Savola (surname), Finnish surname
 The Savola Group, Saudi Arabian industrial food and grocery company
 Red onion in the Malayalam language